Marina Garden Ferry Pier was a ferry pier outside Marina Garden in Tuen Mun south, New Territories, Hong Kong. It is located close to Tuen Mun Ferry Pier and Light Rail Tuen Mun Ferry Pier stop. It provided one ferry route to Tung Chung, Sha Lo Wan and Tai O on Lantau Island, which is operated by Fortune Ferry Company, but the pier was relocated to nearby Tuen Mun Ferry Pier in 2009.

References

Piers in Hong Kong
Tuen Mun District